The National Port Authority Pythons, better known as simply NPA Pythons, is a Liberian basketball team based in Monrovia. It is the basketball team of the National Port Authority organization. The team plays in the LBA League, the top professional league in Libera.

Honours
LBA League
2007, 2019

In African competitions
BAL Qualifiers (1 appearance)
2020 – First Round

References

External links
Facebook profile
NPA Pythons at Afrobasket.com
Basketball teams in Liberia

Sport in Monrovia
Road to BAL teams